Star Patrol Mission Master Pack is a 1981 role-playing game supplement published for Star Patrol by Terra Games Company.

Contents
Star Patrol Mission Master Pack includes three 8 1/2" x 11" cardstock reference sheets printed front and back primarily with the various combat tables from the game.

Publication history
The Mission Master accessory was also included in the 1982 edition of Star Patrol published by Gamescience.

Reception
William A. Barton reviewed Star Patrol Mission Master Pack in The Space Gamer No. 49. Barton commented that "If you're a Star Patrol Mission Master [...] and the price doesn't deter you, you might still find the Mission Master Pack a useful purchase."

References

Role-playing game supplements introduced in 1981
Science fiction role-playing game supplements